Legacy (also known as Legacy: Black Ops) is a 2010 psychological thriller film directed by Nigerian/British director Thomas Ikimi and produced by Black Camel Pictures. The film premiered at the Glasgow Film Festival on 28 February 2010 and was released theatrically in the United States on 15 October 2010. The film stars Idris Elba from The Wire (who was also executive producer with Amrit Walia), William Hope, Eamonn Walker and Richard Brake among others.

Plot synopsis
The story follows Malcolm Gray (Elba) taking sanctuary in a Brooklyn motel room as his mind slowly unravels. He deals with the repercussions over his past and the rise of his brother Darnell (Walker), a ruthless senator, bent on getting into the White House. It becomes clear that all may not be as it seems.

Cast
Idris Elba as Malcolm Gray
William Hope as Mark Star
Eamonn Walker as Darnell Gray Jr
Monique Gabriela Curnen as Valentina Gray
Richard Brake as Scott O'Keefe
Clarke Peters as Ola Adenuga
Julian Wadham as Gregor Salenko
Gerald Kyd as Gustavo Helguerra
Mem Ferda as Andriy
Niall Greig Fulton as Vladimir
John Kazek as Dimitri
Annette Badland as Stephanie Gumpel
Lara Pulver as Diane Shaw
Joe Holt as Ronny Tarbuck
Deobia Oparei as Ray Cloglamm
Juliet Howland as Anne
Christina Chong as Jane
Michael Alspaugh as Carl
Michael Callaghan as Mikhail
Finlay Harris as Darnell's supporter
Adam Smith as Rescue Worker

Production
Director Thomas Ikimi stated at the premiere that, unable to find funding for the film in the UK, he went to Nigeria and was given funding based purely on the fact that he was a Nigerian director rather than on the script itself. He also apologized to the crew for his bad mood throughout filming due to the tightness of the budget and timetable.

The film was completed on the morning of the premiere (28 February 2010), and filmed entirely in Scotland despite being set in Brooklyn.

Reception
Xan Brooks of The Guardian gave the film two out of five starts, saying "it feels like a one-act play that dreamed it was a first-person shooter game."

References

External links
 
 Article at Glasgow Film Festival website
 TheMovieReport.com
 Article at Tribeca Film Festival website
 Talkbackworld.net

2010 films
2010 psychological thriller films
British psychological thriller films
Films shot in England
Films set in Brooklyn
2010s English-language films
2010s British films